Sphenocoelus is an extinct genus of brontothere endemic to North America during the Middle Eocene 46.2—40.4 mya), existing for approximately . Fossils have been found only in southern Wyoming and eastern Utah.

In life, it would have resembled a hornless rhinoceros, to which it was distantly related. Its teeth were adapted to eating soft vegetation, such as forest leaves. Like other brontotheres, it had four toes on the front feet, and three on the hind feet, and the animal is unlikely to have been able to run fast.

Species
 S. blairi
 S. bridgeri
 S. harundivoras
 S. hyognathus (syn. Dolichorhinus longiceps, Telmatotherium cornutum)
 S. intermedius (syn. Dolichorhinus fluminalis, D. heterodon, Mesatirhinus superior)
 S. uintensis.

References

Brontotheres
Eocene mammals of North America
Eocene odd-toed ungulates